Boban Tomić (born May 30, 1988) is a Slovenian professional basketball player who plays for Rieker Komárno. He is a 1.90 m tall point guard.

External links
 Eurobasket.com profile

1988 births
Living people
Basketball players from Ljubljana
Slovenian men's basketball players
KK Krka players
KK Olimpija players
ABA League players
Point guards